Le cinéma du peuple was a French anarchist film cooperative active in 1913 and 1914. In response to Catholic, bourgeois, military, and patriotic propaganda film, Yves Bidamant and Robert Guerard created Le cinéma du peuple on October 28, 1913, in the style of the 1912 "Theater of the People". The cooperative public limited company released nearly 5,000 meters of film reel through May 1914. Armand Guerra directed titles including La Commune with the group. The film was later restored by Cinémathèque Française. The cooperative ended with the rise of World War I.

Films 

 Les misères de l'aiguille (Miseries of the Needle)
 Les obsèques du citoyen Francis de Pressensé (The Funeral of Citizen Francis de Pressensé)
 L'hiver, plaisirs de riches! Souffrances des pauvres! (Winter, Pleasures for the Rich, Sufferings for the Poor!)
 Le Vieux docker (The Old Docker)
 Biribi
 Francesco Ferrer
 Les Actualités ouvrières (The Workers' News)

References

Bibliography

Further reading 

 
 
 

Cooperatives in France
Film organizations in France
Anarchism in France
Organizations established in 1913